Quảng Yên is a county-level town of Quảng Ninh Province in the north-east region of Vietnam. The Bạch Đằng River flows through Yên Hưng. As of 2003 the district had a population of 137,198. The town was established by 2011 from former district of Yên Hưng, which covers an area of 314,2 km².
Quảng Yên border Hạ Long city and Halong bay to the East, Thủy Nguyên, Cát Hải district, Hải Phòng city to the west and south, Uông Bí, Hoành Bồ district to the North.

Administrative divisions
The town consists of 11 wards: Cộng Hòa, Đông Mai, Hà An, Minh Thành, Nam Hòa, Phong Cốc, Phong Hải, Quảng Yên, Tân An, Yên Giang, Yên Hải, and 8 communes: Cẩm La, Hoàng Tân, Hiệp Hòa, Liên Hòa, Liên Vị, Sông Khoai and Tiền An.

References

Districts of Quảng Ninh province
County-level towns in Vietnam